Ain't No Jive... Live! is a live EP by the band Bang Tango.

Track listing
"Dancin' On Coals"
"20th Century Boy"
"Someone Like You"
"Midnight Struck"
"Attack Of Life"

Personnel
 Joe Leste: lead vocals
 Mark Knight: guitar
 Kyle Stevens: guitar
 Kyle Kyle: bass guitar
 Tigg Ketler: drums

References

External links
St. Petersburg Times review

Bang Tango albums
1992 EPs
Live EPs
1992 live albums
MCA Records live albums
MCA Records EPs